Maria Hack (née Barton, 16 February 1777 – 4 January 1844) was an English writer of educational books for children that were praised for their clarity. She was involved in a theological controversy among the Quakers, which led to her joining the Anglican Church. Her books reflect a literal belief in biblical Creation: "A watch must have a watchmaker."

Life and family
Maria was born to John Barton (1755–1789) and his wife Maria Done (1752–1784) in Carlisle on 16 February 1777. Both her parents were Quakers. The family moved to London before Maria's mother died. Her father married again to Elizabeth Horne (1760–1833) of Tottenham, with whose family Mary lived after her father's death. Maria married the Chichester currier Stephen Hack (1775–1823) on 17 November 1800 in Tottenham.

The Hacks had four sons and six daughters. At some point the family moved from Chichester to Gloucester. Her eldest son, John Barton Hack (1805–1884), emigrated to South Australia, as did her youngest, Stephen (1816–1894). Both later left the Quakers. Her daughter Margaret Emily (1814–1886) also wrote educational books, and married Thomas Gates Darton (1810–1887) of Darton and Harvey, the publisher of some of her mother's books. Another son, Thomas Sandon Hack (1811–1865) was an architect who designed several buildings in Southampton, including the Royal Southern Yacht Club (opened 1846) and the original Royal South Hants Infirmary (opened 1844).

Hack, influenced by the Evangelicalism of her time, became involved in a religious controversy among the Quakers, supporting a Manchester minister, Isaac Crewdson, in arguing that Scripture, not Inner Light, should be the ultimate authority and that the sacraments of Baptism and Communion should be performed. She left the Quakers in 1837 and joined the Anglican Church soon after, as a sister and three of her children had already done. Her contribution to the controversy was a tract entitled The Christian Ordinances and the Lord's Supper... (1837).

Hack moved from Gloucester to Southampton in about 1842 and died there on 4 January 1844.

Writings
According to a younger brother, the poet Bernard Barton (1784–1849), Maria was an "oracle" to him in his youth. Her interest in education began with her own family and soon extended into writing. The earliest of many books is thought to have been First Lessons in English Grammar (1812). Winter Evenings (1818) teaches geography through travellers' tales told to two children. The same approach was taken in Grecian Stories (1819) and English Stories (1820–25). Others of her textbooks covered geology and optics. Some of these were still being reprinted in the 1870s.

Hack's best known work was Harry Beaufoy, or, The Pupil of Nature (1821), in which a boy is encouraged by his parents to look closely at creation and discover the marks of a Creator, for "a watch must have a watchmaker" (p. 183). Other examples given as marks of God's creation are the circulation of the blood and the workings of a beehive. The Journal of Education (April 1831) was quoted in a publisher's announcement in another volume as saying that "the mechanism of the human frame is explained so simply and so clearly, that children of ten years old can fully understand and take an interest in the perusal."

Bibliography
Taken from the Dictionary of National Biography (1890) and the British Library Integrated Catalogue:

References

1777 births
1844 deaths
18th-century Quakers
19th-century Quakers
English Quakers
Converts to Anglicanism from Quakerism
English children's writers
19th-century English educators
19th-century British women writers
19th-century English writers